Wayne Dawson (born April 24, 1955) is an American television newscaster and co-host of Fox 8 in the Morning, a morning show broadcast on Fox affiliate WJW-TV Channel 8, in Cleveland, Ohio. For two years prior to joining WJW in 1981, Dawson was an anchor/reporter at WNIR-AM in Kent, Ohio. A graduate of Cuyahoga Community College, Wayne moved on to Kent State University and graduated in 1979 with a Bachelor of Arts degree in journalism. Dawson currently lives in the suburb of Highland Heights, Ohio.

Career Achievements and Honors
An eight-time regional flangie finals Emmy Award winner (Lower Great Lakes-NATAS), Dawson is also a member of the NAACP, the National Association of African American Journalists and the Phi Beta Sigma fraternity. He was inducted into the  Broadcasters Hall of Fame (located in Akron, Ohio) in 2000.

Gaffes

In June 2007, Dawson had jokingly addressed one of his fellow reporters, Kenny Crumpton, as being able to "play a skin flute" in the morning news program Fox 8 in the Morning.  A video about the gaffe was put onto YouTube but WJW-TV Channel 8 quickly  requested for its removal. He was also later involved in the "jiggaboo" comment made by his co- anchor Kristi Capel.

Memoir

References

1955 births
Living people
African-American television personalities
Television anchors from Cleveland
Cuyahoga Community College alumni
Kent State University alumni
Journalists from Ohio
People from Cuyahoga County, Ohio
21st-century African-American people
20th-century African-American people